Piel salvaje (English title: Wild Skin ) is a Venezuelan telenovela produced by RCTV for Televen. It is based on the telenovelas La Fiera and  Pura Sangre written by Julio César Mármol, José Ignacio Cabrujas and Salvador Garmendia. The new version is adapted by Martín Hahn.

Irene Esser and Carlos Felipe Álvarez star as the main protagonists while  Carlos Cruz and Marjorie Magri star as the main antagonists.

Televen began broadcasting Piel salvaje on 2 February 2016. On March 28, 2016, the telenovela debut in Africa on the channel Eva dubbed in English and Portuguese.

Plot
Camila Espino is an impulsive young woman who spent her childhood on the streets before moving to an orphanage as a teenager. She later finds a job at the cosmetic company Mascarada owned by Ezequiel López Méndez who has for years been at war with Fausto Aragón de la Rosa, owner of Capricho, a rival cosmetic company. Camila falls in love with Maximiliano, Ezequiel's son. But their love will be tested by the bitter enmity between the López Méndez and Aragón de la Rosa families, and as Camila continues the search for her birth mother, she will begin to uncover the secrets of the rivalry between these two powerful families.

Cast

Main 

 Irene Esser as Camila Espino
 Carlos Felipe Álvarez as Maximiliano Esquivel
 Carlos Cruz as Ezequiel López Méndez

Secondary 

 Flavia Gleske as Octavia Esquivel
 Estefanía López as Amelia Aragón de la Rosa
 Marjorie Magri as Astrid Salamanqués
 Beba Rojas as La Chila Pérez
 Michelle Taurel as Julia López Méndez
 Gabriel López as Leandro López Méndez

Recurring 
 Amanda Gutiérrez as Elda de Salamanqués
 Kiara as Patricia de Aragón de la Rosa
 Julie Restifo as Marcelina Esquivel
 Gledys Ibarra as Madre Isabel
 Rolando Padilla as Luciano Salamanqués
 Javier Vidal as Fausto Aragón de la Rosa
 Rafael Romero as Alberto Torrealba
 Cayito Aponte as Padre Tiziano
 César Román as Roger Aragón de la Rosa
 Carlos Camacho as Celso Urdaneta
 Ángel Casallas as Axel Infante
 Daniel Vásquez as Gregorio Aragón de la Rosa
 Ángel David Díaz as Sebastián López Méndez
 Fabiola Arace as Rosario Pérez
 Augusto Nitti as Javier López Méndez
 Patricia Amenta as Yelí González
 Germán Anzola as Fernando Aragón de la Rosa
 Mariely Alcalá as Doris Lugo
 Andrés Aponte as Santiago
 Asier Brightman as Moisés "Moi" Castro
 César Maluenga as Jesús "Chuchi" Merchán
 Laureano Olivares as Roberto
 Myriam Abreu as Miriam Dorantes
 Dora Mazzone as Rosa Blanco

References

External links 

Venezuelan telenovelas
RCTV telenovelas
Televen telenovelas
Spanish-language telenovelas
2015 telenovelas
2015 Venezuelan television series debuts
2016 Venezuelan television series endings
Television shows set in Caracas